Ken Nagas (born 18 June 1973) is an Australian former professional rugby league footballer who played in the 1990s and 2000s. He played for the Canberra Raiders of the National Rugby League.

Canberra Raiders

In 1994 Ken Nagas hit form and he played 18 games and scored 11 tries, many of them length of the field runs, the most famous being against St George in Round  10 at Bruce Stadium in Canberra when he ran the length of the field to score while holding the ball in one hand, keeping his shorts up with the other. Nagas went on to play on the wing in Canberra's 36–12 Grand Final win over Canterbury-Bankstown where he scored 2 of Canberra's 7 tries.

Nagas, like the rest of the Canberra Raiders players, signed with Super League in 1995 and although his great form continued, scoring 14 tries from 19 games, he along with team mates Laurie Daley, Bradley Clyde, Brett Mullins, Ricky Stuart and David Furner (other than Nagas, all were players on Australia's 1994 Kangaroo Tour), were left out of 1995 representative teams as only Australian Rugby League contracted players were selected. Canberra finished equal top on the 1995 ladder with Manly but after defeating rivals Brisbane 14–8 at Suncorp Stadium, the defending premiers were knocked out in the Preliminary Final by eventual premiers Sydney Bulldogs 8–25.

In the 1997 World Club Championship, Nagas scored six tries for Canberra against Halifax, a club record. In the 1997 post season, Nagas was selected to play for Australia in all three matches of the Super League Test series against Great Britain.

After eleven seasons with the one first-grade club, knee problems forced Nagas to retire midway through 2002.

Representative career
Nagas was eligible to represent New South Wales rather than his home state of Queensland in State of Origin and elected to do so, a decision he later regretted. He played for the Blues in games II and III of the 1994 State of Origin series, but after his two try performance in Canberra's Grand Final win over Canterbury, was sensationally left out of the 1994 Kangaroo tour in preference to young Brisbane Broncos winger Wendell Sailor.

He was also selected as a winger for New South Wales in the 1997 Super League Tri-series. Nagas played in games I (against Queensland) and III (against New Zealand), scoring two tries in each game as well as the 'Grand Final' of the series against Queensland at Brisbane's ANZ Stadium. The Tri-series Final is known as the longest professional game of rugby league in Australian history. Noel Goldthorpe kicked a field goal in the 104th minute to win the game 23-22 for NSW after scores were locked at 18-18 after full-time and 22-22 after extra time.

In 1997 Nagas played on the wing for Australia in their 34-22 win over New Zealand in the inaugural ANZAC Test at the Sydney Football Stadium. He later went on to play in the season ending loss to the Kiwis at the North Harbour Stadium in Auckland, before appearing in all 3 tests of the Super League Test series against Great Britain in England at the end of the year. However, while the rest of the rugby league world counts all tests played under the Super League banner as being legitimate test matches, the Australian Rugby League refuses to acknowledge the games from the rebels. Thus unfortunately, Ken Nagas, despite appearing in 5 tests during 1997, is listed as never having represented his country in official Australian records.

Later years
In 2004, Nagas was named as a member of the Canberra Raider's best Aboriginal and Torres Strait Islanders to have played for Canberra.

He is currently the trainer for the Canberra Raiders Toyota Cup (Under-20s) team.

Career highlights
 First Grade Debut: 1992 – Round 22, Canberra vs Newcastle Knights at EnergyAustralia Stadium, 30 August
 Premierships: 1994 – member of the Canberra team to defeat Canterbury Bulldogs, 36–12, scoring two tries
 Representative Selection: 1994 – game II of the State of Origin series, NSW defeated Queensland, 14–0

Footnotes

External links
Ken Nagas at The Rugby League Project

Kyogle Turkeys players
Australian rugby league players
Canberra Raiders players
New South Wales Rugby League State of Origin players
1973 births
Country New South Wales Origin rugby league team players
Living people
Australian people of Vanuatuan descent
Indigenous Australian rugby league players
Australia national rugby league team players
Rugby league fullbacks
Rugby league wingers
Rugby league centres
Rugby league players from Bundaberg